The 2021 mayoral election in Allentown, Pennsylvania was held on November 2, 2021. The primary election was held on May 18, 2021.

Background 
Prior Democratic Mayor Ray O'Connell assumed the office in March 2018 following the resignation of former mayor Ed Pawlowski following his federal conviction on 47 counts of conspiracy, bribery, attempted extortion, false statements to federal officials, mail fraud, and wire fraud. O'Connell was eligible for re-election despite his interim term during which he attempted to restore public confidence in the municipal government. However, due to a 27% increase in property taxes, and a hiring freeze coupled with layoffs from the municipal government due to the COVID-19 pandemic resulted in large scale discontent towards him from within his own party.

Campaign

O'Connell faced a six-way split Democratic primary between Himself, Ce-Ce Gerlach, Julio Guridy, Stevie Jones, Matt Tuerk, and Joshua Siegel. Gerlach, 35, served two terms as city councilor and previously served two terms on the Allentown School Board. Guridy, 60, was a city councilor for 20 years who had previously worked for the Delaware River Joint Toll Bridge Commission. Jones, 27, was a political freshmen and Kutztown University alumni who dropped out prior to the primary. Tuerk, 45, was also a political freshmen who held offices in the Allentown Economic Development Corporation and the Lehigh Valley Economic Development Corporation. And Siegel, a city councilmen who left the race early. Police chief Roger MacLean also contemplated joining the race but ultimately did not. On the Republican side, Timothy Ramos would be the sole candidate seeking nomination. The vice president of the Lehigh County Republican Party, he had previously lost to O'Connell in the 2019 Allentown mayoral special election, and his brother, Steve, was a member of the "Latinos for Trump" in 2016 and led its Lehigh Valley local chapter.

Tuerk would win the crowded and hotly contested Democratic primary with just 1.5% or 115 individual votes above O’Connell. This was the most competitive primary in Allentown's history due to the number of candidates within close margins of each other. This primary also saw the highest turnout in a democratic primary since the 2005 election. However, it was not the closest margin that Allentown has seen. In the 1997 election the Democratic nominee was decided by just a singular vote, and in the 2001 election it was just 46 votes. The primary was largely treated as the general election as a Republican had not won the mayoral office in 24 years and with 60% of the city's electorate being registered Democrats. However, for the first time in the city's history both candidates from the major parties would be Latinos.

Turek would center his campaign on bringing more jobs to Allentown. He also knocked, on average, on 1,075 doors per week during his campaign. Tuerk handily defeated Ramos on November 2, with almost double the amount of votes to go on and become Allentown's first Latino mayor.

Results

See also 

 2021 United States elections
 List of mayors of Allentown, Pennsylvania

References 

Allentown
Allentown
2021